TW Andromedae (TW And) is an eclipsing binary star, classified also as an Algol variable star, in the constellation Andromeda. Its brightness varies with a period of 4.12 days, and has a typical brightness of magnitude 8.98 but decreasing down to a magnitude of 11.04 during the main eclipse.

TW Andromedae was discovered to be an Algol variable by August Kopff in 1909.

The TW Andromedae system is made of two stars in a circular orbit around their center of mass, with an orbital plane almost parallel to our line of sight. The presence of a third body in the system, with a minimum mass of 0.27  and an orbital period of 49.6 years, has been proposed to account for the observed changes in the period of the variability.

Like in all Algol variable stars, when both stars of the system are aligned with respect to our line of sight, the furthest component blocks the light of the other, thus the apparent luminosity of the system diminishes. When the brightest component eclipses the other, a secondary, less pronounced minimum in the luminosity occurs.

References

Andromeda (constellation)
Andromedae
BD+32 4756
000262
J00031822+3250451
Algol variables
F-type main-sequence stars